Jarret Brachman is an American terrorism expert, the author of Global Jihadism: Theory and Practice and a consultant to several government agencies about terrorism.

Education and career
Brachman graduated from Augustana College (BA, 2000) and University of Delaware (MA, 2002; PhD, 2006).

He is a former graduate fellow at the Central Intelligence Agency (2003), and the former director of research at West Point's Combating Terrorism Center (2004–08).

He coined the phrase "jihobbyist" in his 2008 book Global Jihadism: Theory and Practice.
It is used to denote a person who is not an active member of a violent jihadi organization such as Al-Qaeda or the Somali Al Shabaab, but who has a fascination with and enthusiasm for jihad and Islamic extremism.

Brachman, now managing director of Cronus Global LLC and a civilian scholar on the faculty of North Dakota State University, regularly briefs government officials on terrorism issues.

In 2013, Brachman joined Wells Fargo's Emergency Incident Management Team.

Works
Stealing Al-Qa'ida's playbook, Jarret M. Brachman, William F. McCants,  Combating Terrorism Center, U.S. Military Academy, 2006
Militant ideology atlas: research compendium, William McCants, Jarret Brachman, United States Military Academy, Combating Terrorism Center, 2006
Terrorism and the American experience: constructing, contesting and countering terrorism since 1793, Jarret M. Brachman, University of Delaware, 2007
Global jihadism: theory and practice, Jarret Brachman, Taylor & Francis, 2008,

See also
Gamification
Jihobbyist

References

External links
Jarret Brachman website
al-Qaida Strategy, Ideology, Doctrine, and Media, YouTube, Oak Ridge National Laboratory, 29.06.2010

Intelligence analysts
Augustana University alumni
University of Delaware alumni
Living people
Place of birth missing (living people)
Year of birth missing (living people)
Terrorism theorists
American non-fiction writers